Robert Arthur Morton Stern, usually credited as Robert A. M. Stern (born May 23, 1939), is a New York City–based architect, educator, and author. He is the founding partner of the architecture firm, Robert A.M. Stern Architects, also known as RAMSA. From 1998 to 2016, he was the Dean of the Yale School of Architecture.

His firm's major works include the classically styled New York apartment building, 15 Central Park West; two residential colleges at Yale University; Philadelphia's Museum of the American Revolution; and the modernist Comcast Center skyscraper in Philadelphia. In 2011, Stern was honored with the Driehaus Architecture Prize for his achievements in contemporary classical architecture.

Early life and education
Born in Brooklyn, New York, in 1939 to a Jewish family, Stern spent his earliest years with his parents in Manhattan. After 1940, they moved to Brooklyn, where Stern grew up. Stern received a bachelor's degree from Columbia University in 1960 and a master's degree in architecture from Yale University in 1965. Stern has cited the historian Vincent Scully and the architect Philip Johnson as early mentors and influences.

Career
After graduating from Yale, Stern worked as a curator for the Architectural League of New York, a job he gained through his connection to Philip Johnson. While at the League, he organized the second 40 Under 40 show, which featured his own work alongside work of then-little-known architects Charles Moore, Robert Venturi and Romaldo Giurgola, all of whom were featured in the influential issue of Perspecta that Stern edited a year before at Yale.  Upon leaving the Architectural League in 1966, Stern worked briefly as a designer in the office of the architect Richard Meier, then worked for two and a half years at New York City's Housing and Development Administration, after which he established Stern & Hagmann with John S. Hagmann, a fellow student from his days at Yale. In 1977 he founded its successor firm, Robert A.M. Stern Architects, now known as RAMSA. Stern remains a partner at RAMSA, and has indicated he has no plans to retire.

Educator
Stern was the dean of the Yale School of Architecture from 1998 to 2016, and has continued to teach there since the end of his tenure. Previously, he taught at Columbia University, in the Columbia Graduate School of Architecture, Planning and Preservation, and from 1984 to 1988 was the director of Columbia's Temple Hoyne Buell Center for the Study of American Architecture.

Other activities
A prolific writer, Stern has authored, co-authored, and edited numerous books about architecture, including five volumes about New York City's architectural history, each focusing on a different period. In 1986, he hosted “Pride of Place: Building the American Dream,” an eight-part documentary series which aired on PBS. The series featured Peter Eisenman, Leon Krier, Philip Johnson, Frank Gehry and other notable architects. "Pride of Place" was well received by the public, although some architects disliked it.

Work

Many of Stern's early works were private houses in the New York metropolitan area, including in the Hamptons and in Westchester County. Early commercial commissions included projects for Walt Disney World such as Disney's Yacht Club Resort, Disney's Beach Club Resort and the masterplan for Celebration, Florida, and from 1992−2003, Stern served on the board of the Walt Disney Company.

Stern is now better known for his large-scale condominium and apartment building projects in New York City, which include 20 East End Avenue, The Chatham, The Brompton and 15 Central Park West. The latter was, at the time of its completion, one of the most financially successful apartment buildings ever constructed, with sales totaling $2 billion.

Stern has designed some of the tallest structures in the United States, including the glass-clad Comcast Center, the second tallest building in both Philadelphia and Pennsylvania. The Driehaus Prize committee (commenting on a preliminary, stone-clad, pyramidal-topped scheme) characterized the design as "[carrying] forward the proportions of the classical obelisk". The scheme, along with Stern's 15 Central Park West, and his master plan for Celebration, were cited as contributing factors in his having won the award. More recently, Stern has designed three skyscrapers in New York City, 220 Central Park South, 520 Park Avenue and 30 Park Place, which will be among the tallest buildings in the city and the United States when complete. In 2017 RAMSA completed a major addition to the campus of Yale University, with two new residential colleges, Pauli Murray College and Benjamin Franklin College, both designed in a Collegiate Gothic style.

Style
In the 1970s, and early 1980s, Stern developed a reputation as a postmodern architect for integrating classical elements into his designs for contemporary buildings, but in the mid-1980s, his work became more traditional, more in keeping with the then emerging New Classical architectural movement. Stern, however, has rejected such characterizations, arguing that his projects draw on vernacular context and local traditions. In recent years, the work of Stern's office has ranged from traditional to modernist, depending on the building type and project location, and is best characterized as eclectic and contextual.

Notable projects

Personal life
Stern owns an apartment in The Chatham, a building he designed in New York City. In 1966, he married photographer Lynn Gimbel Solinger, the daughter of David Solinger and the granddaughter of Bernard Gimbel, a marriage that ended by divorce in 1977. They had one son, Nicholas S. G. Stern, who manages the boutique construction and planning firm Stern Projects.

Awards
 1993: Golden Plate Award of the American Academy of Achievement
 2006: Edmund N. Bacon Prize
 2007: Athena Medal from the Congress for the New Urbanism
 2008: Vincent Scully Prize
 2010: Historic Districts Council's Landmarks Lion Award
 2011: Driehaus Architecture Prize
 2019: Louis Auchincloss Prize

Bibliography
A selection of books written and co-written by Stern:
 New Directions in American Architecture (1969)
 George Howe : Toward a Modern American Architecture (1975)
 New York 1900 : Metropolitan Architecture and Urbanism 1890–1915 (1983)
 New York 1930 : Architecture and Urbanism Between the Two World Wars (1987)
 Modern Classicism (1988)
 Pride of Place : Building the American Dream (1986)
 New York 1960 : Architecture and Urbanism Between the Second World War and the Bicentennial (1997)
 New York 1880 : Architecture and Urbanism in the Gilded Age (1999)
 New York 2000 : Architecture and Urbanism Between the Bicentennial and the Millennium (2006)
 The Philip Johnson Tapes : Interviews by Robert A.M. Stern (2008)
 Paradise Planned : The Garden Suburb and the Modern City (2013)
 Pedagogy and Place: 100 Years of Architecture Education at Yale (2016)
 The New Residential Colleges at Yale: A Conversation Across Time (2018)

References

External links

 Robert A.M. Stern Architects website
 

1939 births
Living people
American neoclassical architects
New Classical architects
Architects from New York City
Fellows of the American Institute of Architects
Driehaus Architecture Prize winners
Columbia College (New York) alumni
Columbia University faculty
Jewish American artists
Jewish architects
Yale School of Architecture alumni
Yale School of Architecture faculty
People from Brooklyn
20th-century American architects
21st-century American architects
Gimbel family
 
Members of the American Academy of Arts and Letters